Gyenesdiás is a village in Zala County, Hungary. Gyenesdiás is located on the north shore of Lake Balaton, next to the town of Keszthely.

External links

Official website
Touristic Association of Gyenesdiás
 Tourism + Pictures - Gyenesdiás

References 

Populated places in Zala County